Sturisoma reisi is a species of catfish in the family Loricariidae. It is native to South America, where it occurs in the Cautário River, the Guaporé River, the Ji-Paraná River, the Mamoré River, and the Sotério River in the Madeira River basin in Bolivia and Brazil. It was described in 2022 by Alejandro Londoño-Burbano and Marcelo Ribeiro de Britto of the Federal University of Rio de Janeiro on the basis of distinctive genetic and morphological characteristics.

References 

reisi
Fish described in 2022
Catfish of South America
Fish of Bolivia
Freshwater fish of Brazil